The 2013/14 season of the Algerian Men's Volleyball League  was the 52nd annual season of the country's highest volleyball level.

Members of the Algerian Men's Volleyball League (2013–14 season)

Regular season

|}

Round 1

|}

Round 2

|}

Round 3

|}

Round 4

|}

Round 5

|}

Round 6

|}

Round 7

|}

Round 8

|}

Round 9

|}

Round 10

|}

Round 11

|}

Round 12

|}

Round 13

|}

Round 14

|}

Round 15

|}

Round 16

|}

Round 17

|}

Round 18

|}

Awards

References

External links
 Algerian Men's Volleyball League 2013/2014
 Volleyball in Algeria

Volleyball competitions in Algeria
2013 in volleyball
2014 in volleyball
2013 in Algerian sport
2014 in Algerian sport